Steven Roesler is an American talent manager who founded Roesler Management, a talent management and full-service marketing company based in Los Angeles, California. Born and raised in Buffalo, New York, Steven began his career in the music industry managing his friends' bands, eventually founding his company in 2012.

Early life and career

1992–2011: early life

Steven attended Williamsville South High School, where he played Viola and was a member of numerous other local orchestras.

2011–2018: career

After finishing school, Steven moved to Florida and began assisting local bands with their day-to-day responsibilities.  In 2012, Steven met Evan Baker of The Analog Affair and officially founded his artist management company.

In 2013, Steven signed Los Angeles band Street Joy and Brooklyn band Wildlife Control (band) to his management roster.  Since then, Street Joy has been featured in Billboard (magazine) and signed a long-term publishing deal with Atlas Publishing.  He was also a management consultant to Swedish band Simian Ghost.

Personal life

In 2011, Steven moved from Buffalo, New York to Gainesville, Florida.  He currently lives in Tampa, Florida.

References

External links

 Roesler Management

Living people
American music managers
American talent agents
Businesspeople from Buffalo, New York
Year of birth missing (living people)